Peoria is an unincorporated community in Richland Township, Mahaska County, Iowa, United States.

Peoria was along the route of the Century Loop on the 2018 RAGBRAI.

References

Unincorporated communities in Mahaska County, Iowa
Unincorporated communities in Iowa